(Cymene)ruthenium dichloride dimer is the organometallic compound with the formula [(cymene)RuCl]. This red-coloured, diamagnetic solid is a reagent in organometallic chemistry and homogeneous catalysis. The complex is structurally similar to (benzene)ruthenium dichloride dimer.

Preparation and reactions
The dimer is prepared by the reaction of the phellandrene with hydrated ruthenium trichloride. At high temperatures, [(cymene)RuCl] exchanges with other arenes:
 [(cymene)RuCl] + 2 CMe → [(CMe)RuCl] + 2 cymene

(Cymene)ruthenium dichloride dimer reacts with Lewis bases to give monometallic adducts:
[(cymene)RuCl] + 2 PPh → 2 (cymene)RuCl(PPh)
Such monomers adopt pseudo-octahedral piano-stool structures.

Precursor to catalysts
Treatment of [(cymene)RuCl] with the chelating ligand TsDPENH gives (cymene)Ru(TsDPEN-H), a catalyst for asymmetric transfer hydrogenation.

[(cymene)RuCl] is also used to prepare catalysts (by monomerization with dppf) used in borrowing hydrogen catalysis, a catalytic reaction that is based on the activation of alcohols towards nucleophilic attack.

It can also used to prepare other ruthenium—arene complexes.

References

Organoruthenium compounds
Chloro complexes
Metal halides
Dimers (chemistry)
Half sandwich compounds
Ruthenium(II) compounds